Leonides may refer to:
 Alvis Leonides
 Leonide
 Saint Leonidas
 St. Leonides
 Leonides, a junior synonym of the noctuid moth genus Erocha

See also
Leonids - a meteor shower
Leonid (disambiguation)
Leonidas (disambiguation)